The Clifford Brown Jazz Festival is a free jazz music festival held annually in June at Rodney Square in Wilmington, Delaware, USA. The first festival was held in 1989 on the open lawn in the center of the city, and has grown into the largest free jazz festival on the East Coast. The event is held to keep alive the memory of Clifford Brown who died in a traffic accident in 1956 along with pianist Richie Powell. Pieces written by Brown and tribute pieces (like Benny Golson's "I Remember Clifford") are often played. Some acts have been staged at the Winterthur Museum, Garden and Library, where a fee was charged.

Past acts 
2020
Arturo Stable Quartet
Sharon Sable Quintet
Cintron
Gerald Chavis Quintet
Mike Boone Quartet
Barbara Walker
Johnathan Barber & Vision Ahead
Vertical Current
Raye Jones Avery - Voices For Healing
Terra Soul Project
Dennis Fortune
The Whitney Project
Korey Riker Band
Fostina Dixon & Winds Of Change
Jeff Bradshaw Band
2019Jeff Bradshaw & Friends
Jamison Ross
Etienne Charles & Creole Soul
Alfredo Rodriguez
Spanish Harlem Orchestra 
Pablo Batista w/ Nestor Torres
The Jenkins Project
Christian Scott
Norman Brown's Summer Storm
Fostina Dixon & the Winds of Change
Mwenso & the Shakes
Raye Jones Avery & Adagio
Kendrick Scott
Terrence Blanchard & E Collective
Branford Marsalis

2018
Laila Biali
Matthew Whitaker
The Clifford Brown Tribute Big Band with Gerald Chavis featuring Ernie Watts
Miguel Zenon Quartet
Jane Bunnett and Maqueque
Arturo Sandoval
The Lao Tizer Band featuring Chieli Minucci, Eric Marienthal & Karen Briggs
Deva Mahal SPECIAL GUEST BRIAN MCKNIGHT
Sammy Miller and The Congregation
Sara Lazarus
Scott Tixier
Sidewalk Chalk
Marcus Miller
2017
Clifford Brown Tribute Band
Alicia Olatuja
Theo Crocker
Karen Rodriguez
Danilo Perez Trio
Arturo O'Farrill Afro-Cuban Jazz Ensemble
High & Mighty Brass Band
Frederic Yonnet
Marsha Ambrosius
Wilmington Youth Jazz Band
Rob Zinn
Sumi Toonoka
Somi
Regina Carter
 
2016
Wilmington Youth Jazz Band
Maya Bellardo
Delaware Jazz All Stars
Miles Jaye
Marcus Johnson
The Ultimate Clifford Brown Tribute Band
Best Kept Soul
Miguel Orlando Band
Adriel Gonzalez Band
Aniya Jazz
Nadjah Nicole
Andra Day
Robert Glasper Trio
Saul Rubin Trio Feat. Leslie 
Valery Ponomarev Big Band
Dr. Lonnie Smith
Euge Groove
Kim Waters
2015
Jackie Brown Jazz@a Band
Clifford Brown Trumpet Consortium
Aniya Jazz
Denise Montana w/Ray Drummond – Bass, Sharp Radway – Pno, Shirazette Tinnen -Drums, 
Jermey Pelt – Trmpt, Jason Curry – Sax, Leon Jordan, Jr – Trmpt, Daniel Bauerkemper – Sax, 
Wayne Escoffery – Sax, Jason Marshall – Baritone Sax, Robin Eubanks – Trombone
Edgardo Cintron & The Cintron Band 
Tito Puente, Jr. Orchestra 
John “Sax” Williams 
Point Blank
Leela James
Norman Conners
Pieces Of A Dream
Jeff Lorber Fusion w/Eric Marienthal, Chuck Loeb, Jimmy Haslip & Khari Parker 
2014
The Brownie-Roach Project
Dianne Schuur
Lynn Riley
Latin Jazz All-Stars: A Tribute to Dave Valentin
Amel Larruiex
Mindi Abair
Aniya Jazz
Jawanza Kobie
Habana Sax
Brian Culbertson
2013
Benny Golson Quartet
United Trumpet Summit - featuring: Randy Brecker, Dr. Eddie Henderson, Dave Douglas & Riley Mullins
Jessy J
Buster Williams Quartet “Something More.” with Patrice Rushen, Cindy Blackman Santana and Stefon Harris 
To the Maxx
BWB - Rick Braun, Kirk Whalum and Norman Brown
JD3
The W. E. S. Group
Pedrito Martinez Group
Lalah Hathaway
2012
Monty Alexander
All-Star Tribute to Lionel Hampton featuring Jason Marsalis, Candido, Robin Eubanks, Kevin Mahogany and Russell Gunn
Claudio Roditi Septet
Randy Weston's African Rhythms
Steve Wilson: Bird with Strings
Christian McBride Big Band
Winston Byrd Quintet
Ernie Watts Quartet
Valerie Capers
Jane Monheit with special guest Mark O'Connor
Aaron Walker & Spiritual Rhythms
All These Miles: The Arpeggio Jazz Ensemble plays the music of Miles Davis
Hiromi: The Trio Project with Anthony Jackson & Simon Phillips
Dee Dee Bridgewater
2011
Junior Mance Quintet
Manifest 3
Ninety Miles
Avery Sharpe Quintet
Soul of Summer
Ronny Jordan Full Band
Take 6
Tizer
The Metta Quintet
Rufus Reid's Out Front Quintet
Rene Marie
Captain Black's Big Band

2010
John Pizarelli Swing Seven
Champian Fulton
Jerry Gonzales and the Fort Apache Band
Omar Sosa Afreecanos Quartet
Ravi Coltrane
Cindy Blackman
Marcus Miller and Christian Scott, "Tutu Revisited"
USAF Satellite Ensemble
Chick Corea Freedom Band
Pyeng Threadgill
Fostina Dixon and Winds Of Change
Tony Williams Ensemble
Mark Williams Quintet
Jose Carmona III

2009
Kombu Kombo
Roy Haynes and the Fountain of Youth Band
Jason Moran
Jazz Attack
Kem
Javon Jackson and Les McCann
The Bad Plus
Odean Pope Saxophone Choir
Dumpstafunk
Pete Escovedo
Bio Ritmo
Burnt Sugar, the Chamber Archestra

2008
Trio 3
Helen Sung Group
George Duke
Crittenden
Suzette Ortiz Jazz Ensemble
Steve Turre and Sanctified Shells
U of D Jazz Camp Graduates
Dr. Guy's Musiqology
Jumpin' Off A Cleff
Huascar Barradas
Raw Sugar Quintet
Atiba's Dream
David Sanborn Group
Hiromi's Sonic Bloom
Rashid Ali's Quintet
Clifford Brown Tribute Band featuring Terell Stafford
Maria Schneider Orchestra
Dirty Dozen Brass Band
Bonerama
Barbara Walker
Point Blank
Mingus Big Band

2007
The Mahavishnu Project
Skerik's Maelstrom Trio
The Blue Method
The Rhythm Council featuring Henry Butler & Papa Mali
Big Chief Bo Dollis and the Wild Magnolias
The Ed Palermo Big Band
The New Mastersounds
Jean Luc Ponty
Norman Brown's Summer Storm featuring Peabo Bryson, Jeff Lorber and Marion Meadows
Sherry Winston
Rob Swanson Quintet
Stanley Clarke
Wallace Roney (replaced Freddie Hubbard) and the New Jazz Composers Octet
Elegua
Aquiles Báez
Afghan Jazz Project
Metta Jazz Quintet

2006
Count Basie Orchestra
Edward Simon 
Crimson Jazz Trio
Rebirth Brass Band 
Wade in the Water Tour: Bill Summers, Troy Andrews, Mark Brooks, Jamal Batiste, Davell Crawford, Leon Brown, Donald Harrison, Shaka Zulu, Frenchy Frechette
Sandy Graham
The Tiptons
McCoy Tyner Trio 
The RAW Sugar Quintet
Pucho and His Latin Soul Brothers 
Fortune Vinson Cruse
Jae Sinnett
John Pizzarelli
Curtis Fuller
Smithsonian Jazz Masterworks Orchestra 
Rayford Griffin
Wilby Fletcher, Jr. 
Duke Ellington's Sacred Concert

2005
JazzReach Hangin' With the Giants
Concert of Sacred Music featuring Duke Ellington's Sacred Music
Michael Wolff and Impure Thoughts
Diane Schurr featuring Dave Sammuels' Caribbean Jazz Project
Karl Denson's Tiny Universe
The Funky Meters
Chris Brubeck's Triple Play
The Headhunters
Ingrid Jensen and Project O
Lou Donaldson and Dr. Lonnie Smith
Flora Purim and Airto Moriera
Poncho Sanchez Latin Jazz Band
JazzChords of Calloway
Council of Jazz Advocates Wilmington Youth Jazz Band
Kennedy Center Betty Carter Jazz Ahead Graduates
Sherrie Maricle and The DIVA Jazz Orchestra with Rachael Price
Irvin Mayfield and the New Orleans Jazz Orchestra
Judith Owen
Louis Hayes and the Cannonball Adderley Legacy Band
Hugh Masekela

2004
T.S. Monk
Dave Valentin/Hiltin Ruiz Latin Jazz Project
David Sanchez
Ahmad Jamal
Ceceilia Smith and Jay Hoggard
Big Bad Voodoo Daddy
Jimmy McGriff
Stefon Harris and Blackout
Regina Carter and Del Symphony
Cassandra Wilson
Lincoln Center’s Afro-Latin Jazz Orchestra

2003
Roy Hargrove
Terrell Stafford
Randy Brecker
David Weiss
The Preservation Hall Jazz Band
Barbone Street Jazz Band
Arturo Sandoval
Rolando Matias and Afro-Rican Ensemble
Kenny Barron
Greg Osby
The Masters of Groove
Lalah Hathaway
Herbie Hancock with The Delaware Symphony Orchestra
Wynton Marsalis/Lincoln Center Jazz Orchestra

2002
Cab Calloway Orchestra
Claudia Acuna
Onaje Allan Gumbs Septet
Take 6
Nnenna Freelon
Omar Sosa Octet
Robert Jospe
The Langston Hughes Project-Ask Your Momma
Terrence Blanchard with the Delaware Symphony Orchestra
Nestor Torres
John Scofield
Bootsie Barnes Quintet

2001
The Afro-Rican Ensemble
The Navigators
Chuck Mangione
Fred Hughes Trio
Barbone St. Jazz
Fortune Vinson Cruse
Melissa Walker
Airmen of Note
Branford Marsalis
Cintron
Lenora Zenzalai Helm
Groove Collective

2000
Ingrid Jensen
Nicholas Payton’s Louis Armstrong Centennial
Regina Carter
Joshua Redman
Stefon Harris
Dianne Reeves
Cecila Smith
Mary Kadderly
Cyrus Chestnut
Clarence “Gatemouth” Brown Big Band
Michael Brecker
McCoy Tyner with Michael Brecker

1999
Lou Donaldson Quartet
The Jazz Messengers: The Legacy of Art Blakey
Benny Golson and Randy Brecker
Steve Turre  and Mulgrew Miller
Buster Williams and Carl Allen
Nnenna Freelon
Gonzolo Rubalcaba Trio
Alex Bugnon
Najee
Earl Klugh
Patti Austin
David Sanborn
Ivan Lins
!Cubanisimo!

1998
Dizzy: The Man and His Music
Featuring:  Ignacio Berroa, Cyrus Chestnut
Jon Faddis, Slide Hampton
Antonio Hart and John Lee
Pat Martino
Nancy Wilson
Heads Up Super Band: Kenny Blake, Joe McBride and Gerald Veasley
The Rippingtons with Russ Freeman
Joyce Cooling
Gato Baribieri
Lee Ritenour
Clarence Fountain and the Five Boys
Staple Singers

1997
Stanley Clarke
Spyro Gyro
Roy Hargrove
Ramsey Lewis
Jonathan Butler
4th World with Flora Purim and Airto
Marlena Shaw
Kevin Mahogany
Tom Grant
Manny Oquendo and Libre
Edgando Cintron and Tiempo Noventa
United Nations Jazz Orchestra
Paquito d’Rivera

1996
Sonny Rollins
Betty Carter
Terrence Blanchard
Boney James
Norman Brown
Poncho Sanchez
Tania Maria
Rick Braun
Keiko Matsui
Bela Fleck and The Flecktones
Tuck and Patti

1995
Clark Terry
T.S. Monk
Geri Allen
Wallace Roney
Randi Crawford
Pieces of A Dream
Hiroshima
The Caribbean Jazz Project
Randy Brecker and Denis DiBlasio
Mario Grigorov
John Mayall and the Bluesbreakers
KoKo Taylor and Her Blues Machine

1994
Raye-Avery Jones
Judith Kay with First State Ensemble
Wayne Krantz
The Duke’s Men – Former members of Duke Ellington's Orchestra
Dave Schiff and Quartet
Harry Spencer and Vaneisa

1993
Lou Rawls and Band
Ray Baretto Jazz Ensemble
Angela Bofill
Benny Golson and The All Star Band featuring Helen Merrill
The Joe Harris Jazz Quartet
The Lionel Hampton Big Band

References 

Jazz festivals in the United States
Music festivals in Delaware
Wilmington, Delaware
Tourist attractions in Wilmington, Delaware